Protein unc-45 homolog A is a protein that in humans is encoded by the UNC45A gene.

References

Further reading

Co-chaperones